Motown 40 Forever is a compilation album released to commemorate the 40th anniversary of Motown Records.

Track listing

Charts

References

Motown compilation albums
1998 compilation albums
Record label compilation albums